Virbia ampla is a moth in the family Erebidae. It was described by Francis Walker in 1865. It is found in Mexico.

References

Moths described in 1865
ampla